The Akron Tyrites were a Minor league baseball team based in Akron, Ohio. They played in the Class B Central League from 1928 to 1929. The team returned to the league in 1932, but then moved to the city of Canton during the midseason and played under the name Canton Terriers. The team was managed by John McCloskey in each of its seasons.

MLB alumni
Casper Asbjornson 
Allen Benson
Ed Clough 
Roy Grimes 
Kenny Hogan
Irv Jeffries 
Chuck Hostetler
Fred Koster 
Les Mallon 
Alex McColl

References

External links
Baseball Reference: Akron, Ohio – Minor League City Encyclopedia

Defunct minor league baseball teams
Professional baseball teams in Ohio
Defunct baseball teams in Ohio
Central League teams
Baseball teams disestablished in 1929
Baseball teams established in 1928